The Welcker's Resort Historic District is located in Gibraltar, Wisconsin, United States.

History
The district largely consists of buildings from the resort founded by German immigrant Dr. Herman Welcker in 1907 with a regimen influenced by European health spas of the time, catering initially to Germans from Milwaukee. District includes former cottages of the resort, the current White Gull Inn, and the current Whistling Swan, which was the Lumberman's Hotel in Marinette before Welcker had it hauled across Green Bay on the ice to become his "Casino."

References

Historic districts in Wisconsin
Historic districts on the National Register of Historic Places in Wisconsin
National Register of Historic Places in Door County, Wisconsin